Some notable science fiction authors are (in alphabetical order):

A 
 Felix Aderca
 George Anania
 Victor Anestin
 Mihai Alexandru
 Sorin Antohi
 Gheorghe Apostol

B 
 Romulus Bărbulescu
 Rodica Bretin

C 
 Mircea Cărtărescu
 Vladimir Colin
 Ovid S. Crohmălniceanu

D 
 Doru Davidovici

G 
 Radu Pavel Gheo

H 
 Ion Hobana

L 
 George Lazăr

M 
 Alexandru Mironov
 Dumitru Munteanu
 Nina Munteanu

P 
 Ovidiu Pecican
 Cristian Tudor Popescu

R 
 Liviu Radu

S 
 Bogdan Suceavă

See also
 Women science fiction authors
 List of science fiction editors
 Novelists
 List of fantasy authors
 List of horror fiction authors
 List of military science fiction works and authors
 List of Clarion South Writers Workshop Alumni
 List of Clarion South Writers Workshop Instructors
 List of Clarion West Writers Workshop alumni
 List of Clarion West Writers Workshop instructors
 List of Clarion Writers Workshop Alumni
 List of Clarion Writers Workshop Instructors
 Lists of authors
 List of science fiction authors
 Internet Speculative Fiction DataBase
 :Category:Science fiction writers
 :Category:French science fiction writers
 Black science fiction

References

External links
 If you add any authors to this list, please also consider adding them to the A-Z list of authors. Add only WP:Notable authors, please.

Science fiction
Authors